The thread angle of a screw is the included angle between the thread flanks, measured in a plane containing the thread axis. This is a defining factor for the shape of a screw thread. Standard values include:

References

Notes

Bibliography
.
 

Screws
Metalworking terminology
Threading (manufacturing)